Strange Journey Volume One is the third mixtape and the first installment in the Strange Journey Series from Southern hip hop group CunninLynguists, released on March 24, 2009. The release features guest appearances from Killer Mike, Khujo of Goodie Mob, Skinny DeVille and Fish Scales of Nappy Roots, Slug of Atmosphere, Tonedeff, PackFM, Substantial, Mac Lethal, Looptroop Rockers, Hilltop Hoods, and former group member Mr. SOS. It is entirely produced by Kno.

Release 
The first single, "Never Come Down (The Brownie Song)" was released online on February 2, 2009. The song's music video was released on February 23. The second single will be "Don't Leave (When Winter Comes)", featuring Slug, b/w "Nothing But Strangeness", featuring Looptroop Rockers and Hilltop Hoods. Strange Journey Volume One is the first installment in the Strange Journey series, followed by Strange Journey Volume Two in 2009 and Volume Three in 2014.

Track listing

References

CunninLynguists albums
2009 mixtape albums
Hip hop compilation albums